Ryabov is a Russian masculine surname, its feminine counterpart is Ryabova. It may refer to
Alexander Ryabov (born 1979), Russian ice hockey player
Alyona Ryabova (born 1988), Kazakhstani volleyball player
Anastasia Ryabova (born 1985), Russian artist 
Anatoli Ryabov (born 1994), Russian ice hockey player
Andrey Ryabov (born 1969), Russian football player
Ekaterina Ryabova (born 1997), Russian singer
Georgi Ryabov (1938–2020), Soviet football player
Sergei Ryabov (born 1977), Russian film director, artist and animator
Vyacheslav Ryabov (born 1989), Ukrainian football player
Yekaterina Ryabova (1921–1974), Russian military pilot

Russian-language surnames